The 79th Pennsylvania House of Representatives District is located in central Pennsylvania and has been represented by Louis Schmitt Jr. since 2019.

District profile
The 79th District is located in Blair County and includes the following areas: 

 Allegheny Township
 Altoona
 Logan Township
 Tunnelhill (Blair County Portion)

Representatives

References

Government of Blair County, Pennsylvania
79